Cryptocelidae is a family of flatworms.

Genera
The following genera are recognised in the family Cryptocelidae:
 Adenodactyloplana Bulnes, Faubel & Ponce de Leon, 2003
 Cryptocelis Lang, 1884
 Hylocelis Faubel, 1983
 Macginitiella Hyman, 1953
 Notoplanella Bock, 1931
 Phaenocelis Stummer-Traunfels, 1933

References

External links

Turbellaria